Ferahnüma was an Ottoman corvette launched in 1792. The British Royal Navy captured her on 21 March at the Alexandria expedition of 1807. The Royal Navy commissioned her under Commander Samuel Fowell in early 1808, and disposed of her in 1809, probably early in the year. Commander Fowell assumed command of HMS Roman circa April 1809.

Citations

References
 
 
 

1792 ships
Age of Sail naval ships of the Ottoman Empire
Ships built in the Ottoman Empire
Captured ships
Sloops of the Royal Navy